The e.GO Life is an electrically powered, four-seater microcar from Next.e.GO Mobile SE in Aachen, which has been in production since April 2019, has a range of 140 km (WLTP) and a battery capacity of 21,5 kWh. The aluminium space frame chassis and thermoplastic outer skin makes it not only very durable but also sustainable. The production for the e.GO Life started in 2019 and the first cars were delivered to customers in May 2019.

History
Until June 2021, the manufacturer's managing director was Günther Schuh, who was already involved in the founding of StreetScooter GmbH. The development of the e.GO vehicle models takes place on the campus of the RWTH Aachen, where Schuh is a professor for production systematics. The e.GO Life was originally planned as a light electric vehicle, but the concept was further developed into a class M1 passenger car. The final look of the vehicle, for which Italian designer Paolo Spada is responsible, was presented in March 2017 at CeBIT in Hanover.

In April 2017 it was announced that the production plant was to be built in the east of Aachen, on the former Philips site, and that construction work had already begun. On September 16, 2017, the company announced that there were already 1,200 pre-orders and that the e.GO Life should come onto the market in three performance variants from summer 2018 after discussion with customers. Production was originally scheduled to start in May 2018 and delivery in October 2018. In July 2018, the first factory was opened.

The production model of the vehicle was presented to the public for the first time at the Geneva Motor Show in March 2019.

The e.GO Life has been available for pre-order since May 18, 2017. Initially, 1,000 First Edition vehicles were to be produced in 2019; For technical and legal reasons, these vehicles should be throttled to 53 kW and delivered without regenerative braking.

Series production started in March 2019. On April 26, 2019, all the necessary homologation tests for a European small series approval of the e.GO Life First Edition were completed with the last test being passed. The first production vehicles were then delivered on May 8, 2019. On July 1, 2019, the Federal Office of Economics and Export Control (BAFA) put the e.GO Life on the list of eligible vehicles. A total of 126 funding applications for an e.Go Life were submitted by December 1, 2019.

In 2019, 540 vehicles were sold. The e.GO Life should be offered in three performance levels from 2020. As of 2019, the list price of the basic model with  should be 17,900 euros. However, in November 2019 it was announced that the prices of the 2020 models will increase compared to the prices announced in 2019 due to special editions and the higher environmental bonus.

Overview
The e.GO Life is designed as a city car and second car. The vehicle is rear-wheel drive and is a 2+2 seater. The car has a space frame. The rolling chassis of the car is made of aluminum profiles and sheets, reinforced with steel in some places and clad with colored plastic panels. The front wheels are individually suspended on MacPherson struts and control arms, and a rigid De Dion axle designed as a "U"-shaped drawbar axle is installed at the rear. Disc brakes are installed on all wheels.

Other models

e.GO Life Sport
A performance-enhanced concept vehicle of the vehicle was presented with the Concept Sport.

e.wave X
The presentation of the E.Go Life Concept Cross study was canceled due to the COVID-19 pandemic. In May 2022, the significantly revised electric car e.wave X was presented.

Sales of the e.wave X began on October 17, 2022, after it was unveiled at the 2022 Paris Motor Show.

Technology

Engine and battery
The e.GO Life should initially have a 48-volt drive system from the automotive supplier Robert Bosch GmbH. However, following customer requests, a high-voltage system was rescheduled. Bosch supplies the electric motor, the control unit, the charger, the display and the battery. After-sales service is to be provided by the Bosch Car Service outlets.

Charging capacity
The e.GO Life can be charged at the household socket with a normal Schuko plug. The maximum charging power is 2.3 kW (230 V, 10 A). In order to be able to charge the battery faster, the e.GO Life is equipped with a type 2 plug. At launch, however, the maximum charging power of the battery was limited to 3.7 kW (230 V, 16 A, single-phase). This means that enough energy can be charged in one hour for approx. 24 km of additional driving distance with standard consumption.

e.GO offers the "wallbox home" wall charging station for at home at a price of 549 euros (as of November 2018) to charge the battery with a type 2 plug (a 5-meter cable is included). The "wallbox" charging station has a maximum charging capacity of 11 kW (according to the manufacturer "for future vehicle generations of the e.GO family").

Technical specifications
The manufacturer information as of September 16, 2017, March 2019, January 2020 and June 2020:

Sales
According to the Federal Motor Transport Authority, the first e.GO brand vehicle was registered in May 2019. In the period from May to November 2019, a total of 103 e.GO Life First Edition vehicles were registered in Germany. In 2019 as a whole, 171 vehicles of the brand were newly registered. In 2020, 477 e.GO Life were newly registered. In 2021 there were 123 models.

By the end of 2020, 546 applications for the "Life First Edition" and 129 applications for the "Life First Edition Mj. 2020" were submitted.

References

External links

 e.GO Life on the website of Next.e.GO Mobile SE
 Fabian Hoberg: e.Go Life: Testfahrt in Deutschlands günstigstem Elektroauto. ADAC, 25 April 2019.

City cars
Car models
Production electric cars